Minor Mishap is a studio album featuring American jazz trumpeter Freddie Hubbard recorded in August 1961. The session was led by trombonist Willie Wilson, who died shortly after the recording date. The album is the only known recording made by Wilson. The album was first released in 1966 exclusively in the Netherlands and in United Kingdom as Groovy! under the Fontana label, and then re-released by Prestige Records in 1970 under Duke Pearson's name as Dedication! and appears on CD without alternate takes by that title as well.

Reception
Scott Yanow of Allmusic wrote a positive review, stating "This is one of Freddie Hubbard's more obscure sessions of the 1960s. Actually, it was originally led by the forgotten trombonist Willie Wilson (who died in 1963). The 23-year-old trumpeter is teamed with Wilson, baritonist Pepper Adams, and the Duke Pearson Trio (with bassist Thomas Howard and drummer Lex Humphries) for originals by Wilson, Pearson, Adams, Donald Byrd, and Tommy Flanagan in addition to two standards that feature the trombonist. This is an excellent hard bop date and well worth picking up by straight-ahead jazz fans."

Track listing

Personnel
Band
Pepper Adams – sax (baritone)
Thomas Howard – bass
Freddie Hubbard – horn, trumpet
Lex Humphries – drums
Duke Pearson – piano
Willie Wilson – trombone - ballad features tracks 5 and 10

Production
Alun Morgan – liner notes
Fred Norsworthy – engineer
David Redfern – photography
Malcolm Walker – design

References

1989 albums
Freddie Hubbard albums
Black Lion Records albums